Andrea Benini (born March 14, 1977), better known by his stage name Mop Mop, is an Italian musician and producer. He performs with his band, the Mop Mop Combo, as well as a DJ worldwide. Mop Mop achieved international recognition when he was included in the soundtrack of Woody Allen's To Rome With Love in 2012.

Mop Mop's single "Run Around", featuring Funk legend Fred Wesley on trombone and Anthony Joseph on vocals, has been charted as best dancefloor jazz track of 2013 according to Red Bull Music Academy Germany.

Mop Mop Combo personnel
 Andrea Benini - Drums
 Anthony Joseph - Vocals
 Alex Trebo - Piano, Keyboards
 Pasquale Mirra - Vibraphone
 Salvatore Lauriola - Bass
 Telonio - Bass
 Danilo Mineo - Percussion

Discography

Studio albums
 The 11th Pill (2005, Tam Tam Studio)
 Kiss of Kali (2009, INFRACom!)
 Ritual of the Savage (2010, INFRACom!)
 Isle of Magic (2013, Agogo)
 Lunar Love (2016, Agogo)

EPs and singles 
 Perfect Day EP, 12" EP (2006)
 Locomotive, Single (2008)
 Kiss of Kali, 12" EP (2008)
 Ritual of the Savage Remix, EP (2010)
 Ash, Single (2010)
 Ritual of the Savage Remix Vol2, EP (2011)
 Remixed : A Tropical Reconstruction, 12" EP (2013)

References

External links
 Official website
 Mop Mop at Discogs
 The Financial Times music's review of Mop Mop album Isle Of Magic

Italian jazz musicians
Italian electronic musicians
Electronica musicians
Intelligent dance musicians
Remixers
Musical groups established in 2005
1977 births
Living people
People from Cesena